USS Thorn (DD-988), a Spruance-class destroyer, was the second ship of the United States Navy to be named for Lieutenant Jonathan Thorn (1779–1811), who took part in Decatur's expedition to destroy the captured frigate Philadelphia in 1804.

Construction and career 
Thorn was laid down on 29 August 1977 by Ingalls Shipbuilding, Pascagoula, Miss.; launched on 22 November 1978  (Thorn was christened on 3 February 1979 by Mrs. Patricia Ansley); and commissioned on 16 February 1980.

Thorn was decommissioned and stricken from the Navy list on 25 August 2004.

Thorn was sunk as a test/target at 08:50 on 22 July 2006 off the US east coast.

Gallery

References

External links 

 

Spruance-class destroyers
Cold War destroyers of the United States
1979 ships
Ships sunk as targets
Shipwrecks